The 1999 Missouri Tigers football team represented the University of Missouri during the 1999 NCAA Division I-A football season.  They played their home games at Faurot Field in Columbia, Missouri.  They were members of the Big 12 Conference in the North Division. The team was coached by head coach Larry Smith.

Schedule

Coaching staff

References

Missouri
Missouri Tigers football seasons
Missouri Tigers football